The 2001 SpeedVision World Challenge was the 12th running of the Sports Car Club of America's premier series.

Results

References

GT World Challenge America